Booth is a masculine given name of English origin.

List of people with given name Booth
 Booth Colman, American film, television and stage actor
 Booth Gardner, American politician
 Booth Grey (1740–1802), British politician
 Booth Grey (1783-1850), British politician
 Booth Savage, Canadian actor
 Booth Tarkington, American writer

See also 
 Booth (surname)
 Booth (disambiguation)

English masculine given names